Luis Demetrio, born Luis Demetrio Traconis Molina (April 21, 1931 – December 17, 2007) was a Mexican singer and composer, best known for having composed the Spanish-language pop standard "¿Quién será?", whose English version, Sway, was a hit for Dean Martin in 1954.

Life and career
Luis was the youngest of four children and only son of Don Juan B. Traconis and Ofelia Molina, born in Mérida, Yucatán. At the age of three he showed his inclination for music playing Yucatecan popular tunes on a harmonica. At age 12, he revealed his gifts as a composer with his first song, “Happiness”. In 1948 he traveled to Mexico City to pursue a career in accounting, as his family wanted, but he was determined to become a musician.

In 1950, with the famous Avileño trio, he recorded his song “Yo no sé qué siento aquí”, almost simultaneously, Damaso Perez Prado the 'King of Mambo presented this same song, with a new name “La Cerveza”.

When Pérez Prado met Luis Demetrio he believed in his vocal skills and invited him to join the chorus of his orchestra, which was the main attraction of the popular Teatro Margo.

By 1954, at the height of Cha-Cha-Cha, Luis Demetrio choirs Latin Cuban orchestra, directed by Maestro  Ninon Mondéjar, who immediately included in its repertoire and records songs Luis Demetrio "Cha-Cha-Cha-Chavela", "In You, in You", "Do You Expect", "Cha-Cha-Cha with Melody", "Love Me a Little More", "The Salk Vaccine", and several others, to complete a dozen hits with the orchestra.

In 1955, with the famous harmonic Cuartero, who were also their countrymen, he recorded his themes "Two Strangers" and "You're Everything To Me", the latter also a big hit in the voice of the famous composer Luis Arcaraz. Arcaraz also recorded “Calendar” and “To Come Back To Me”.

In 1957, "The Gate" would become popular in the voice of Chilean singer Lucho Gatica.

In 1958, Luis Demetrio songs were interpreted by major singers of that era: Pedro Vargas recorded "You're Poisoning"; Andy Russell, "Young and Beautiful"; Miguelito Valdez 'Mr. Babalu', made "Corazón Salvaje" successful, while Virginia and Puerto Lopez did the same with "You Waiting".

Luis Demetrio took over the artistic direction of a major record company, retiring from his activity as a composer in 1960 and 1961.

He eventually returned as a composer, with songs such as "Day" (Angélica María); "The Wineglass" for Olga Guillot; "I Will", "Si Dios Me Quita la Vida" and "In Your Hair", (Javier Solis), "Bravo", (Celia Cruz), and "Te Necesito", for Carlos Lico

Other songs, such as "Lean On My Soul", "The Devil and I", "Your Ashes and Mine", "In the Canteen", "Art Thou My Wife", "What a Night, What a Moon and What a Cat", "Hate", "Who will" (with Pablo Beltran Ruiz), "Make the Most Juice to Life", "My Only Fault", and many others were interpreted by artists such as Eydie Gormé, Billy Vaughn, Lola Flores, Roberto Ledezma, Lucha Villa, Elena Burke, The Barry Sisters, Tito Rodriguez, Lucecita Benitez Perete, Elis Regina, Gloria Lasso, Mona Bell, Rocio Dúrcal, Alberto Vazquez, Freddy Noriega, Manolo Muñoz, Marco Antonio Muñiz, Dean Martin, Tito Puente, José Antonio Méndez, Diego El Cigala, Michael Bublé and Luis Miguel, to name a few.

In 1970 a new challenge, which assumed with great responsibility and passionate delivery, to promote awareness of the history of Mexico through music, and to the surprise of friends and admirers, putting all his artistic activities on hold to undertake his new roll.

Luis Demetrio told: "How tedious, and the need to memorize dates made me hate history class" This was one of the reasons that motivated him to create this project.

The poet Salvador Novo encouraged him and offered his collaboration; Luis Demetrio then began developing a Biographical History of Mexico with songs and Drawings. The project went slowly as a result of its meticulous production. This challenge led him to make a substantial investment that affected its economy.

This Biographical History of Mexico with Songs and Drawings consists of 86 songs that address events between pre-Hispanic times and different presidents of Mexico. Luis Demetrio was based on the textbooks of the Ministry of Education, but also with the support of Salvador Novo, historians David Sandoval Garcia and Miguel Sandoval Siberia Taboada, and authors, composers and arrangers like Victor Manuel Mato, Salvador Peniche Laura Acosta, Enrique Acevedo, Mario Patrón, Eduardo Magallanes, Ignacio Gonzalez Murillo, Rigoberto Alfaro, Enrique Neri and Juan Garcia Esquivel; the setting of the Zavala Brothers, Narrators Guillermo Ochoa, Lourdes Guerrero, Álvaro Mutis and Luis Ignacio Santibanez hear, among others.

Performers like Aida Cuevas, Dulce, Rosenda Bernal, Armando Manzanero, Carlos Lico, Alberto Vázquez, Pepe Jara, Arianna, Manolo Muñoz, Jorge Macias, Los Caminantes and Luis Demetrio himself.  These historical episodes are narrated through the centuries of Mexican History between the sounds of flutes, rubber drums pre-Hispanic reminiscent of flamenco and jazz, as well as the Corridos and the traditional Mexican music performed by Mariachi Vargas.

Simultaneously, Luis Demetrio created a video of the Mexican Biography recreating some of passages of this production, with performances by artists like Angelica Aragon and Rogelio Guerra.

This project that took Luis Demetrio several decades of exhaustive work, was formally out in 10 CDs and 10 DVDs in English and Spanish, subtitled in both languages, created primarily for Mexican Children and for people with hearing disabilities.

This work has received recognition from many personalities of the Mexican society, Authorities and Intellectuals, is a new system to teach Mexican History to current and future generations.

Properly protected your copyright, this unique work in the world gave Luis Demetrio the pattern to create songs inspired by international characters and their historic surroundings, like Hirohito (Japan), Winston Churchill (Great Britain), General Franco (Spain) Mussolini (Italy), Charles De Gaulle (France), and Benjamin Franklin and George Washington (USA), among others, performed in the language of their country.

By 1981 Luis Demetrio resumed his artistic activity with tours both in Mexico and abroad, and seasons cabaret in the Hotel del Prado, The Scene, The Loot, The Gatsby Stouffer President Hotel, Restaurant Lake, the Ambassador and the Camino Real.

In 1991 he was invited to collaborate with television Morelos and was thus produced the musical La Casa de Luis Demetrio (1991-1994) series, and La Puerta de Luis Demetrio (1995-1997), which had as many guests, renowned artists both local and international.

Tireless in everything related to music making, Luis Demetrio also produced a series of albums to honor great Mexican composers, entitled I Am, which contains the biographies in video and the most representative compositions of each author, which include Ricardo Palmerín, Augie Cardenas, Pepe Dominguez, Armando Manzanero, Los Montejo, Sergio Esquivel, Agustín Lara, Gonzalo Curiel and Alvaro Carrillo, among others.

On October 26, 2005, the Society of Authors and Composers of Mexico, in its first edition of Career Awards honored the Maestro. Luis Demetrio occasion of his 50 years as a composer.

Luis Demetrio died on December 17, 2007, in the city of Cuernavaca, Morelos, and his legacy enriches the musical heritage of Mexico. On February 24, 2010, his bronze bust by sculptor Sergio Peraza Avila in the Plaza de los Composers Mexico City was unveiled.

Awards
His popularity led to a valuable crop of awards. In 1964 he received the Musa de Radiolandia award for Best Composer of the Year.

In 1965, he would win the Trébol de Oro award for Best Sales, the Diosa de Plata Award in the 11th Mexican Television Contest, for Best Composer, and the Micrófono de Oro, awarded by the Mexican Association of Broadcasters, for Best Composer. Also in 1965, he would win the Calendario Azteca, awarded by the Mexican Association of Journalists of Radio and Television (AMPRyT). That year he would also win the WHON Trophy (New York); the Farándula Magazine, and the KWKW Award (Los Angeles, California).

In 1966 he would receive the Trébol de Oro Musart award for Best Sales of the Year; the Hebilla de Oro award for Best Artist of the Year (Canal 2, Panamá) and an award and mention for finishing in the second place on the 1st Festival of the Latin Song of Miami, Florida.

In 1967 he would be awarded the Palme d'Or after finishing first in the International Festival of Hollywood.

Notable songs
Luis Demetrio achieved international fame with songs like: 
 ”Calendar”
 ”The Door”
 ”If God takes my life”
 ”Happiness”
 ”The glass of wine”
 ”I do not know I'm here”
 ”You are everything to me”
 “Sway”

Influence
Luis Demetrio songs have been featured in numerous films and telenovelas. Plus, his songs have been performed by artists such as:
Rocío Dúrcal
Lucho Gatica
Olga Guillot
Dámaso Pérez Prado
Nacho Vegas
Pedro Vargas
Virginia López
Celia Cruz
Javier Solís
Dean Martin
The Barry Sisters
The Pussycat Dolls

References

1931 births
2007 deaths
20th-century Mexican male singers